Ischiodon aegyptius, the epauletted hoverfly, is a species of fly which is known to inhabit the Afrotropical realm.

The adults are pollinators and hover among many flowers, whilst the larvae are green and featureless, feeding on aphids. The fly resembles a small wasp, and is a very powerful flier.

References

Diptera of Africa
Syrphini